Marc Albert may refer to:

 Marc Albert (tennis) (born 1960), Dutch tennis player
 Marc Albert (volleyball) (born 1961), Canadian Olympic volleyball player